The Post-Birthday World is a novel by Lionel Shriver published in 2007, some four years after her previous novel, the award-winning We Need to Talk About Kevin.

Inspiration
As pointed out by Carrie O'Grady in The Guardian, it contains many autobiographical elements: the main protagonist Irina is of Russian descent, so speaks the language Shriver studied at university, and they are both Americans living in London and have both ended secure long-term relationships having fallen for 'more creative' types. Sarah Lyall in The New York Times explains that Shriver found this decision the hardest in her life and goes on to quote her "There was more than one moment that I could have gone either way, I know what it’s like to be on the knife edge and to have this inkling that whichever way you go it’s going to have huge implications." It was the potential consequences of this decision which inspired the story.

Book structure
The book follows a 'parallel-universe' structure. At the end of the first chapter the protagonist Irina, in a happy long-term relationship, is tempted to kiss another man. After this common first chapter the narrative splits, with two chapter 2s, and chapter 3s etc. One stream following Irina after she succumbs to the temptation, the other as she resists. In her 2008 postscript to the book Shriver explains that this structure "allows me to explore the implications, large and small, of whom we choose to love" She goes on "I was not interested in writing a novel about the Good Man vs. the Bad Man, which would be flat and leave the reader with nothing to do. Instead, like We Need to Talk About Kevin before it, Post-Birthday World is what I call participatory fiction. You are presented with Irina's two departing futures, and the end of the novel throws Irina's original quandary right back in your lap"... "Do you kiss the guy or not?"

Plot introduction
Irina McGovern, a moderately successful children's book illustrator, lives with her long-term partner, the steady companionable Lawrence, a researcher at a London think-tank on international relations. Once a year they meet with Jude and her professional snooker player husband Ramsey Acton on his birthday. After Jude and Ramsey divorce, Lawrence and Irina continue the tradition. The following year, 1997, Lawrence is away in Sarajevo but encourages Irina to contact Ramsey, leading to the fateful decision on which the rest of the book hinges: whether or not to kiss Ramsey after retiring to his house to smoke dope after their restaurant meal.

In the first narrative Irina leaves Lawrence and moves in with Ramsey, leading to a fiery marriage as she accompanies him on the professional snooker tour and neglects her own career. In the other she remains with Lawrence though increasingly feels that their relationship is going nowhere. The two narratives intersect periodically as both personal and international events (such as the death of Diana, Princess of Wales and the September 11 attacks) intervene and the final chapter is indeed shared by both narratives...

Reception
It received generally positive reviews:
Michiko Kakutani in the New York Times was generally positive, concluding "Lawrence often verges on being a parody of a judgmental, snobbish prig, while Ramsey often verges on being a parody of a hard-living, irresponsible celebrity. Surely, the reader thinks, someone as sensitive and discerning as Irina could have looked for a man who combined their better qualities and actually shared at least a couple of her interests. That we’re able to overlook the flaws of Ramsey and Lawrence is, in the end, a testament to Ms. Shriver’s ability to make Irina into a thoroughly compelling character, an idiosyncratic yet recognizable heroine about whom it’s impossible not to care."
Siddhartha Deb in The Telegraph writes "Shriver's central aim is to explore the limits of human desire within the context of a few well-examined lives. In that, The Post-Birthday World remains a wise and moving novel, touching us most deeply when it shows us how finite our lives are, and how infinite we want them to be."
Carrie O'Grady in The Guardian was more critical, "Could it be that this book's rigidity, its avoidance of risk, is because the story is too close to the author's own? Shriver could have added more potential outcomes - what if Ramsey dumped Irina? What if Lawrence, the worm, suddenly turned - and Shriver kept us guessing, as she did in Kevin? Instead she sacrifices drama for Irina's musings and homilies. There's a sense of events playing out in neat, parallel tracks, as if predetermined - which you might want them to do, under certain circumstances. But a bit of chaos is much more fun, both in life and in fiction."

External links
Book Reviews - The Post-Birthday World by Lionel Shriver
Reading Guide from HarperCollins

References

2007 American novels
Novels set in London
Fiction set in the 1990s
Cue sports literature
Sports novels
Novels about artists
Alternate history novels